Al-Ghafiqi is a surname. Notable people with the surname include:

 Abdul Rahman Al Ghafiqi, a governor of Al-Andalus
 Muhammad ibn Aslam Al-Ghafiqi, a 12th-century Andalusian oculist and author of The Right Guide to Ophthalmology
 Abū Jaʿfar al-Ghāfiqī, a 12th-century Andalusian Arab botanist, pharmacologist, physician

Nisbas